The 1952 New York Giants season was the franchise's 70th season. The team finished in second place in the National League with a 92–62 record, 4½ games behind the Brooklyn Dodgers.

Offseason
 December 11, 1951: Eddie Stanky was traded by the Giants to the St. Louis Cardinals for Chuck Diering and Max Lanier.

Regular season

Season standings

Record vs. opponents

Opening Day lineup

Notable transactions
 May 17, 1952: Bill Howerton was selected off waivers by the Giants from the Pittsburgh Pirates.

Roster

Player stats

Batting

Starters by position 
Note: Pos = Position; G = Games played; AB = At bats; H = Hits; Avg. = Batting average; HR = Home runs; RBI = Runs batted in

Other batters 
Note: G = Games played; AB = At bats; H = Hits; Avg. = Batting average; HR = Home runs; RBI = Runs batted in

Pitching

Starting pitchers
Note: G = Games pitched; IP = Innings pitched; W = Wins; L = Losses; ERA = Earned run average; SO = Strikeouts

Other pitchers
Note: G = Games pitched; IP = Innings pitched; W = Wins; L = Losses; ERA = Earned run average; SO = Strikeouts

Relief pitchers
Note: G = Games pitched; W = Wins; L = Losses; SV = Saves; ERA = Earned run average; SO = Strikeouts

Farm system

Notes

References
 1952 New York Giants at Baseball Reference
 1952 New York Giants at Baseball Almanac

New York Giants (NL)
San Francisco Giants seasons
New York Giants season
1952 in sports in New York City
1950s in Manhattan
Washington Heights, Manhattan